Laxmi Agarwal  (born 1 June 1990) is an Indian acid attack survivor, a campaigner for rights of acid attack victims, and a TV host. She was attacked in 2005 in New Delhi at the age of 15.

In 2019, she was honored with the International Women Empowerment Award from the Ministry of Women and Child Development, the Ministry of Drinking Water and Sanitation and UNICEF for her campaign of Stop Acid Sale. In 2014, she received the International Women of Courage award at the hands of First Lady Michelle Obama. 

The movie Chhapaak is based on her life and stars Deepika Padukone in her role.

Early life and the attack 
Laxmi was born in New Delhi.

In 2005, tragedy came when Laxmi was 15 years old and an 11th-grade student, she was approached by a man working in her neighbourhood, Naeem Khan, who was 32 years old. He proposed to Laxmi but she rejected him. She did not inform anyone about this because her family would've blamed her and stopped her studies. Ten months later, Laxmi Agrawal, was returning from Khan market at 10:45 in the morning when she received the same message from Naeem that he loves her and wants to marry her. She did not respond. In no time, she was attacked with acid by Naeem and Kamran (Naeem's older brother). Kamran called Laxmi's name from behind while riding his motorcycle. When Laxmi looked behind as a response to her name, Naeem threw acid directly at her face from the backseat. Laxmi fainted and after regaining consciousness, she tried to walk up and ask for help but met multiple road accidents. A man named Arun Singh called the police, but he saw her skin melting from the acid, he realised it might be too late to wait for assistance. Someone else splashed water on her face hoping to reduce the burns, this caused the acid to move down and burn her neck. Arun, then somehow got her in the back seat of his car. This later caused burn holes in the seat covers. He admitted her to Ram Manohar Lohia Hospital. The police reached the hospital directly. Arun then asked Laxmi about her family and where she lived. He reached her house, informed her family, and took them from their house to the hospital. She underwent multiple operations including eye surgery. Four days after the attack, Naeem Khan was arrested, but was bailed out a month later. He married off immediately. However, after widespread protests and media attention, he was sentenced to prison for life.

Public interest litigation in Supreme Court 
Agarwal, whose face and other body parts were disfigured in the acid attack, had public interest litigation (PIL) in 2006. A minor then, she was attacked with acid by three men near Tughlaq road in New Delhi as she had refused to marry Naeem Khan, known as Gudda, one of the trio. Her PIL sought framing of a new law, or amendment to the existing criminal laws like IPC, Indian Evidence Act and CrPC, for dealing with the offence, besides asking for compensation. She also pleaded for a total ban on the sale of acid, citing an increasing number of incidents of such attacks on women across the country.

During a hearing in April, the Centre assured the Supreme Court of India that it would work with the state governments to formulate a plan before the next hearing on 9 July. However, it failed to do so, which angered the court. However, when the Centre failed to produce a plan, the Supreme Court warned that it would intervene and pass orders if the government failed to frame a policy to curb the sale of acid in order to prevent chemical attacks. "Seriousness is not seen on the part of the government in handling the issue," the bench headed by Justice RM Lodha said. Earlier, in February, the court had directed the centre to convene in six weeks a meeting of Chief Secretaries of all states and union territories to hold a discussion for enacting a law to regulate the sale of acids and policy for treatment, compensation and care and rehabilitation of such victims.

Meanwhile, in 2013, the Supreme Court ruled in favor of Agarwal and Rupa's plea, thereby creating a fresh set of restrictions on the sale of acid. Under the new regulations, acid could not be sold to any individual below the age of 18 years. One is also required to furnish a photo identity card before buying acid.

Agarwal claims that not much has changed on the ground, despite all the regulations. "Acid is freely available in shops. Our own volunteers have gone and purchased acid easily. In fact, I have myself purchased acid," she said. "We have launched a new initiative called ‘Shoot Acid’. By means of the Right to Information Act, we are trying to acquire data concerning the sale of acid in every district. We intend to present the information collected through this initiative before the Supreme Court to apprise them of the situation on the ground."

Personal life
Laxmi Agarwal was in a relationship with social activist Alok Dixit. However, she has been separated from her partner since 2015, When they were together, Laxmi decided not to get married and instead opted to be in a live-in relationship. "We have decided to live together until we die. But we are challenging society by not getting married. We don’t want people to come to our wedding and comment on my looks. The looks of a bride are most important for people. So we decided not to have any ceremony," said Laxmi. Their families have accepted the relationship and also their decision not to have a ceremonial wedlock.

Hunger strike and campaign against acid violence 
The acid attack survivors started a hunger strike demanding immediate justice and rehabilitation for acid attack survivors. She wrote a poem describing her situation during the incident.

While she was in the United States to receive the International Women of Courage award, she was praised by the then USA first lady Michelle Obama and others for her campaign against acid violence.

In popular culture
She starred in the 2014 short documentary Newborns directed by Megha Ramaswamy as herself.

The film Chhapaak is based on Agarwal's life story and was released on 10 January 2020.  Deepika Padukone played the role of Agarwal.

References 

Acid attack victims
Indian victims of crime
Indian women activists
Living people
People from New Delhi
Indian women poets
21st-century Indian poets
21st-century Indian women writers
21st-century Indian writers
Poets from Delhi
1990 births
Women writers from Delhi
Indian women television journalists
Indian television journalists
Journalists from Delhi
Activists from Delhi
Indian women's rights activists
21st-century Indian journalists
Women human rights activists
Recipients of the International Women of Courage Award